Mauricio Fernando Aros Bahamonde (born 9 March 1976) is a Chilean former professional footballer who played as a left-back.

Club career
Aros began his career in the youth squads of Deportes Concepción and debuted as a professional in 1995. In 1998, Aros left the club for Universidad de Chile and won two Primera División Chilean Championships and two Copa Chile trophies with the club.

In 2001, he signed for Dutch club Feyenoord. He won the 2001–02 UEFA Cup with the club, as an unused substitute in the final, but did not receive regular playing time. In 2002, Aros was loaned to Israeli club Maccabi Tel Aviv and in 2003 he was loaned to Saudi club Al-Hilal.

In the middle of 2004, Aros contract expired and he returned to Chile to play for Huachipato. He then moved to Cobreloa for two years.

In the Clausura 2007 tournament, Universidad de Concepción made the finals of the playoffs and lost to Colo-Colo.

International career
Aros made his international debut for the Chile national team on 29 April 1998 against Lithuania. He was a participant at the 1998 FIFA World Cup with Chile. He only played in one game at the '98 World Cup, which was in the Round of 16 match versus Brazil. Aros participated in three Copa América's (1999, 2001, and 2004). In the 1999 Copa América, Chile made it to the semifinals against Uruguay. The game went to penalties and Aros missed the second penalty shot, which would prove to be the decisive penalty for Chile. Chile went on to lose the third place game versus Mexico. His last international match was against Costa Rica on 14 July 2004 in a group match of the 2004 Copa América. Aros finished his international career with 30 caps.

Honours
Universidad de Chile
 Primera División de Chile: 1999, 2000
 Copa Chile: 1998, 2000

Feyenoord
 UEFA Cup: 2002

Universidad de Concepción
 Copa Chile: 2008

References

External links

1976 births
Living people
Chilean footballers
Association football fullbacks
Chile international footballers
Chile under-20 international footballers
Chilean Primera División players
Primera B de Chile players
Universidad de Chile footballers
C.D. Huachipato footballers
Feyenoord players
Maccabi Tel Aviv F.C. players
Al Hilal SFC players
Cobreloa footballers
Unión Temuco footballers
Deportes Concepción (Chile) footballers
Universidad de Concepción footballers
O'Higgins F.C. footballers
UEFA Cup winning players
Eredivisie players
1998 FIFA World Cup players
1999 Copa América players
2001 Copa América players
2004 Copa América players
Chilean expatriate footballers
Chilean expatriate sportspeople in the Netherlands
Expatriate footballers in the Netherlands
Chilean expatriate sportspeople in Israel
Expatriate footballers in Israel
Chilean expatriate sportspeople in Saudi Arabia
Expatriate footballers in Saudi Arabia
People from Magallanes Province